Keepin' It Real or Keeping It Real may refer to:

In music:
 Keepin It Real (Camoflauge album)
 Keepin' It Real (Craig's Brother album)
 Keepin' It Real (25 ta Life album), an album by 25 ta Life
 Keepin' It Real (C-Block album), an album by C-Block

In other media:
 Keeping It Real (novel), a novel by Justina Robson
 Keepin' It Real with Al Sharpton, a radio talk show
 Keepin' It Real (film), a 2001 film directed by Brian Cox

See also 
 "Keepin' It Reel", an episode of Happy Tree Friends
 Keep It Real (disambiguation)